Baykit is a rural locality in Evenkiysky District of Krasnoyarsk Krai, Russia, located on the Podkamennaya Tunguska River. Population:

Transportation
Baykit is served by the Baykit Airport.

Climate
Baykit has a subarctic climate (Köppen climate classification Dfc) with bitterly cold winters and warm summers. Precipitation is moderate and is heavier in summer and fall than during other seasons.

References

Rural localities in Krasnoyarsk Krai
Road-inaccessible communities of Krasnoyarsk Krai
Evenkiysky District